Traminette is a  cross of the French American hybrid Joannes Seyve 23.416 and the German Vitis vinifera cultivar Gewürztraminer made by  Herb C. Barrett ca. 1965 at the University of Illinois, Urbana/Champaign.  His intention was to produce a large clustered table grape with the flavor of Gewürztraminer. He sent the cross to the New York State Agricultural Experiment Station grape breeding program at Cornell for development when he departed from Illinois. Traminette was found to have excellent wine quality, combined with good productivity, partial resistance to several fungal diseases, and cold hardiness superior to its acclaimed parent, Gewürztraminer, while retaining a similar character. 

Traminette produces solid yields, ranging in studies from 12 to 22 lbs/vine average. 

Traminette wine has been chosen by the Indiana Wine Grape Council as the signature wine of the state. The wine is also produced in some regions of Ohio, the Yadkin Valley AVA of North Carolina, the Finger Lakes AVA and Niagara Escarpment AVA of New York, and parts of Virginia, as well as in Pennsylvania and Southern New England.

References

External links 

http://www.nysaes.cornell.edu/hort/faculty/reisch/bulletin/traminette.html

White wine grape varieties
Hybrid grape varieties
American wine
Table grape varieties
Symbols of Indiana